Marcus Stokes is an American director. Marcus began his career in film as a visual effects artist at George Lucas' Industrial Light and Magic (ILM). After his work on major films such as Star Wars: Episode I – The Phantom Menace and I, Robot, Marcus began directing with a sci-fi short that was acquired by HBO.

Early life
Before his career in films, Marcus worked in Architectural design and holds a master's degree from the University of California, Berkeley. Marcus also worked in rural Japan as a language instructor and translator.

Currently
Marcus is the founder and president of The Working Director, a Santa Monica-based company specializing in training aspiring professional directors. Marcus' current directing projects include The Signal, starring Michael Ealy and Grace Phipps, and post-apocalyptic thriller, O2, which he is collaborating on with Cody Zwieg (The Lazarus Effect, The Hills Have Eyes).

Filmography
Visual Effects (17 credits) including Small Soldiers, Star Wars Episodes I & II, The Matrix Reloaded, Spider-Man 2, I Robot, and Serenity.
Director (6 credits) including shorts The Catalyst, Chains, and The Signal.
Asst Director (1 credit) on Mind Tricks.
Producer (5 credits) including the 35th and 36th NAACP Image Awards, and The Signal.
Writer (4 credits) including shorts The Catalyst, Chains, and The Signal.

External links
 Marcus Stokes' website
 
 
 The Working Director
 

American cinematographers
American entertainment industry businesspeople
American film directors
American film producers
American science fiction writers
American male screenwriters
Living people
Cinema of the San Francisco Bay Area
Science fiction film directors
Special effects people
University of California, Berkeley alumni
Fantasy film directors
English-language film directors
Year of birth missing (living people)
American film editors